Iron nitrides are inorganic chemical compounds of iron and nitrogen.

Chemical properties
Iron has five nitrides observed at ambient conditions, Fe2N, Fe3N4, Fe4N, Fe7N3 and Fe16N2. They are crystalline, metallic solids. Group 7 and group 8 transition metals form nitrides that decompose at relatively low temperatures – iron nitride, Fe2N decomposes under loss of molecular nitrogen at around 400 °C and formation of lower-nitrogen content iron nitrides. They are insoluble in water. At high pressure, stability and formation of new nitrogen-rich nitrides (N/Fe ratio equal or greater to one) were suggested and later discovered. These include the FeN, FeN2 and FeN4 solids which become thermodynamically stable from 17.7 GPa, 72 GPa and 106 GPa, respectively.

Health hazards
When heated to decomposition or exposed to humidity, iron nitride may emit toxic fumes of ammonia. It is considered a moderate explosion hazard. Inhalation of iron nitride dust or powder may cause irritation to the respiratory system and possibly acute iron poisoning or pneumoconiosis.

Research applications
Colloidal solution of magnetic iron nitride nanoparticles is a way to create ferrofluids.

Iron nitrides also make the strongest naturally magnetic material.

References

Iron compounds
Nitrides